Kenneth David Chant (born 6 June 1933) is an Australian Pentecostal pastor with CRC Churches International.  He was ordained in 1952 in the CRC. He is the elder brother of Barry Chant, who is the founder (with the Reverend Dennis Slape) and former president of Tabor College, Australia.

Chant has planted eight churches and been pastor of several others.  For several years he was the editor of two Australian charismatic and Pentecostal journals, Revivalist and Vision.  He has been the principal of four Bible colleges (in Australia and the USA) and has spoken and taught in churches, crusades, conferences, seminars and colleges in a dozen different countries worldwide.

On 9 June 2014, Chant was appointed a Member of the Order of Australia (OAM), General Division, in the Queen's Honours List.

Vision International College and University 

In 1974 he established Vision International College in Launceston, Tasmania, as a "Bible correspondence school". To enhance this teaching ministry, he moved to the US in 1981 and, with Stan DeKoven, established Vision International University, which merged the correspondence courses with a local church campus program. In 2010 the college had some 7,000 teaching centres in more than 150 countries with more than 100,000 students.

Author and composer 
Chant is the author of 50 books, including many college texts. He has also composed a number of gospel songs published in various collections both in Australia and other countries.

Bibliography

 Sitting on Top of The World (Bethany Fellowship, 1972) 
 Building the Church God Wants 
 Dynamic Christian Foundations 
 Dazzling Secrets for Despondent Saints 
 Authenticity and Authority of the Bible 
 Faith Dynamics 
 Clothed With Power 
 The Pentecostal Pulpit (Vision Publishing, 2012) 
 Better Than Revival (Vision Publishing, 2012) 
 The Cross and The Crown (Vision Publishing, 2012) 
 Throne Rights (Vision Publishing, 2013)

Notes

External links
Personal website

1933 births
Living people
Australian Pentecostal pastors
20th-century Christian clergy
Pentecostal writers